Saiva is a genus of Asian planthoppers, family Fulgoridae. They are colourful insects, marked boldly in red, blue, white and black, with a prominent slender stalk like structure arising on the head that points upwards or forward.  The known distribution is from India, through Indo-China to Borneo.

Species
Fulgoromorpha Lists on the Web lists:
 Saiva bullata 
 Saiva cardinalis 
 Saiva coccinea 
 Saiva formosana 
 Saiva gemmata  - type species
 Saiva guttulata 
 Saiva insularis 
 Saiva karimbujangi 
 Saiva nodata 
 Saiva phesamensis 
 Saiva pyrrhochlora 
 Saiva semiannulus 
 Saiva transversolineata

References

External links

Fulgorinae
Auchenorrhyncha genera